John H. Lawrenson (29 March 1921  – 28 March 2010) was an English professional rugby league footballer who played in the 1930s, 1940s and 1950s, and coached in the 1960s.

Playing career

International honours
Johnny Lawrenson won caps for England while at Wigan in 1939 against Wales, in 1940 against Wales, in 1941 against Wales, in 1946 against Wales (2 matches), in 1948 against Wales, and France, in 1949 against Wales, and Other Nationalities, while at Workington in 1950, and for Great Britain while at Wigan in 1948 against Australia (3 matches).

Championship final appearances
Johnny Lawrenson played left-, i.e. number 4, and scored a goal in Wigan's 13-9 victory over Dewsbury in the Championship Final first-leg during the 1943–44 season at Central Park, Wigan on Saturday 13 May 1944, and played left- in the 12-5 victory over Dewsbury in the Championship Final second-leg during the 1943–44 season at Crown Flatt, Dewsbury on Saturday 20 May 1944.

Challenge Cup Final appearances
Johnny Lawrenson played , i.e. number 5, in Leeds' 19-2 victory over Halifax in the 1940–41 Challenge Cup Final during the 1940–41 season at Odsal Stadium, Bradford, in front of a crowd of 28,500, and played , i.e. number 2, and scored 2-tries in Workington Town's 18-10 victory over Featherstone Rovers in the 1951–52 Challenge Cup Final during the 1951–52 season at Wembley Stadium, London on Saturday 19 April 1952, in front of a crowd of 72,093.

County Cup Final appearances
Johnny Lawrenson played right-, i.e. number 3, and scored 3-goals in Wigan's 9-3 victory over Belle Vue Rangers in the 1946–47 Lancashire County Cup Final during the 1946–47 season at Station Road, Swinton on Saturday 26 October 1946, and played , i.e. number 5, in the 14-8 victory over Warrington in the 1948–49 Lancashire County Cup Final during the 1948–49 season at Station Road, Swinton on Saturday 13 November 1948.

Career records
Johnny Lawrenson holds Workington Town's "Most Tries In A Season" record, with 49-tries scored in the 1951–52 season.

Honoured at Wigan
Johnny Lawrenson was a life member at Wigan.

References

External links
Statistics at wigan.rlfans.com
(archived by web.archive.org) » Legends Evening 50's

1921 births
2010 deaths
England national rugby league team players
English rugby league coaches
English rugby league players
Great Britain national rugby league team players
Leeds Rhinos players
Place of birth missing
Place of death missing
Rugby league wingers
Wigan Warriors coaches
Wigan Warriors players
Workington Town players